Companisto is an international equity-based crowdfunding website. It was founded by the lawyers David Rhotert and Tamo Zwinge in June 2012, in Berlin. Companisto allows investors to invest in startups. In return, they become shareholders and are entitled to a share of any profits, as well as potentially benefiting from an exit. Companisto has over 130.000 investors from 92 countries. It is Germany's largest network for investments in start-ups and growth companies.

Business model
Companisto allows investors to invest in startups. In return, they become shareholders and are entitled to a share of any profits, as well as potentially benefiting from an exit.

History
Companisto investors have funded 18 startups in the first twelve months. As of April 10, 2014, 29 startups were funded with a collective amount of 5 Million € by investors from 47 different countries.

In July, 2014 Weissenhaus raised 1.2 Million € in first 3.5 days in Europe's first ever real estate crowdfunding. In August, 2014 it reached 4 Million €, making it the biggest crowdinvesting in Europe. Since March, 2014, the English-language site has allowed submissions from any business based in Europe, and investments from anywhere in the world. In April, 2014, Companisto opened an office in Zurich, Switzerland.

In December 2015 Companisto exceeded €25M in funding, in December 2016 Companisto exceeded $36M in funding, in Mai 2018 Companisto exceeded €50M in funding.

All Companisto supported Startups together created over 1200 new jobs.
Companisto is market leader in D-A-CH.

In March 2019 Companisto announced Equity Investment, meaning that investors can now become real company shareholders. Investors are no longer limited to €10,000 and total investment is no longer limited to $2.4 million.

As of December 2022, 255 startups were funded with a collective amount of 174 Million €.

References

External links 

Crowdfunding platforms of Germany
Financial services companies established in 2012
Companies based in Berlin